Michael Bauer (born 1973, Erkelenz, Germany) is an artist based in Cologne.

Bauer has shown his paintings in many group exhibitions including "Das Kabinet" at Galerie Hammelehle und Ahrens , Cologne, "Superschloss" at Stadtische Galerie, Wolfsburg and "Brotherslasher" (with Jonathan Meese). He represented by Marc Foxx  in Los Angeles and Hotel  in London. His work has been seen in eight solo exhibitions and in group exhibitions in Europe and America since 1999.

See also
 List of German painters

References

External links
Michael Bauer at Hotel Gallery
Michael Bauer at Saatchi Gallery

1973 births
Living people
German contemporary artists
20th-century German painters
20th-century German male artists
German male painters
21st-century German painters
21st-century German male artists
People from Erkelenz